Scholl is a surname. Notable people with the surname include:

 Amalie Scholl (1823-1879), German composer
 Andreas Scholl (born 1967), German countertenor
 Aurélien Scholl (1833–1902), French journalist and writer
 Chiara Scholl (born 1992), American tennis player
 Edward T. Scholl (1937-2003), American politician
 Elisabeth Scholl (born 1966), German soprano
 Hans Scholl (1918–1943), member of the White Rose resistance movement in Nazi Germany
 Hans Scholl (astronomer) (born 1942), German astronomer
 Inge Scholl (1917–1998), German activist
 Mehmet Scholl (born 1970), German footballer
 Robert Scholl (1891–1973), German politician
 Roland Scholl (1865–1945), Swiss-German chemist
 Sophie Scholl (1921–1943), member of the White Rose resistance movement in Nazi Germany
 William Scholl (1882–1968), US chiropodist and inventor of Dr. Scholl's brand footwear

See also 
 Dr. Scholl's, a foot care brand also simply known as "Scholl" in some countries
 Hans and Sophie Scholl
 Schöll
 Schull (disambiguation)

German-language surnames